Kara Fatima Khanum ("Black Lady Fatima". Kurdish: Fata Reş) was a female chieftain of a Kurdish tribe from Marash (present Kahramanmaraş in southeastern Turkey). Her lifetime spanned the 19th century, though her exact dates are not easy to reference. She personally commanded a Kurdish contingent in the Crimean War to prove her loyalty to the Ottoman state following the imprisonment of her husband, the tribal leader.

According to the local historian Cezmi Yurtsever from the Kahramanmaraş-Adana area, Kara Fatma (1820-1865) was the nickname of Asiye Hanım from Andırın who fought during the Crimean War. She featured prominently in The Illustrated London News of 22 April 1854, which devotes a long article and a full-page illustration to her arrival, with a large retinue of mounted warriors of her tribe, in Constantinople.

The Illustrated London News described her as:The Queen, or Prophetess -- for she is endowed with supernatural attributes -- is a little dark old woman of about sixty, with nothing of the amazon in her appearance, although she wears what seems to be intended for male attire, and bestrides her steed like the warriors of her train. She is attended by two handmaids, like herself in masculine costume, and was brought across the Bosphorus, with a select band of followers, to a species of barrack in Stamboul.Fatima Khanum arrived in Constantinople at the beginning of the Crimean war with a retinue of 300 horsemen "to request an audience with the padishah to show support and offer assistance." One German observer described her as having a "manly look". Fatima Khanum's exact dates appear uncertain, however, and scholar Michael Gunter has suggested that she fought in the Russo-Turkish war of 1877.

In 1887 the Chicago Tribune described Kara Fatima as 'The Redoubtable female warrior of Kurdistan'. The newspaper notes that the Ottoman government provided her with a monthly stipend and describes her as 'tall, thin, with a brown, hawklike face; her cheeks are the colour of parchment, and her face is reamed with scars. Wearing the national dress of the sterner sex, she looks like a man of 40, not like a woman who will never again see 75.'

References

Kurdish female military and paramilitary personnel
Kurdish people from the Ottoman Empire
Ottoman military personnel of the Crimean War
Women from the Ottoman Empire in warfare
People from Kahramanmaraş
Kurdish people
19th-century people from the Ottoman Empire
Women in 19th-century warfare